The 2010 AIBA Youth World Boxing Championships were held in Baku, Azerbaijan, from April 25 to May 3, 2010. It was the second edition of the AIBA Youth World Boxing Championships which had taken over from the Junior World Championship. The competition is under the supervision of the world's governing body for amateur boxing AIBA and is the junior version of the World Amateur Boxing Championships.

A total of 466 boxers from 96 different countries registered to compete in this edition of the competition.

Medal winners

Medal table

See also
 World Amateur Boxing Championships

References

Youth World Amateur Boxing Championships
Boxing
Youth, 2010
Youth World Boxing Championships 2010
Sports competitions in Baku
2010s in Baku
April 2010 sports events in Asia
May 2010 sports events in Asia